National Secondary Route 250, or just Route 250 (or ) is a National Road Route of Costa Rica, located in the Alajuela province.

Description
In Alajuela province the route covers San Carlos canton (Aguas Zarcas, Pital districts).

References

Highways in Costa Rica